Estonia Cricket Association is the official governing body of the sport of cricket in Estonia. Its current headquarters is in Tallinn, Estonia. Estonia Cricket Association is Estonia's representative at the International Cricket Council and is an associate member and has been a member of that body since 2008. It is also a member of the European Cricket Council.

See also
Estonia national cricket team
Estonian Cricket League

References

External links
Official site of Estonia Cricket Association

Cricket administration
Cricket
Cricket in Estonia